Acrosorium polyneurum is a species of red algae first described by Okamura. It grows in intertidal and shallow subtidal waters in Japan where it is grazed by the sea urchin Hemicentrotus pulcherrimus.

References

Delesseriaceae